Hryhorii Krasovskyi (born October 8, 1982) is a Ukrainian footballer playing with FC Vorkuta in the Canadian Soccer League.

Career 
Krasovskyi began his career in 1998 in the Ukrainian Second League with SC Odessa. The following season he signed with FC Chornomorets Odesa, where he saw action in the Ukrainian First League including with the reserve team. In 2003, he played in the Ukrainian Amateur Football Championship with FC Tyras-2500 Bilhorod-Dnistrovskyi. He played abroad in 2007 in the Kazakhstan Premier League with FC Atyrau, and the next season with FC Zhetysu. In 2008, he returned to Ukraine to play with Dniester Ovdiopol, and later with FC Real Pharma Odesa in 2011. 

In 2017, he played in the Canadian Soccer League with FC Vorkuta. He played with Canadian Soccer League expansion franchise Kingsman SC for the 2019 season. In 2021, he returned to his former club Vorkuta. He assisted in securing Vorkuta's third regular season title in 2021.

References 

1982 births
Living people
Ukrainian footballers
SC Odesa players
FC Chornomorets Odesa players
FC Chornomorets-2 Odesa players
FC Tyras-2500 Bilhorod-Dnistrovskyi players
FC Atyrau players
FC Zhetysu players
FC Dnister Ovidiopol players
FC Real Pharma Odesa players
FC Continentals players
Kazakhstan Premier League players
Canadian Soccer League (1998–present) players
Association football goalkeepers
Ukrainian First League players
Ukrainian Second League players
People from Kerch